Kapa o Pango is a pre-match haka, or challenge, composed by Derek Lardelli, which is unique to the New Zealand national rugby union team, the All Blacks. Since 2005, the "Kapa o Pango" haka has been performed before rugby test matches by the All Blacks as an alternative to the usual "Ka Mate" haka. The longest sequence of "Kapa o Pango" performances is four, which happened in 2014.

History
In August 2005, before the Tri-Nations test match between New Zealand and South Africa at Carisbrook stadium in Dunedin, the All Blacks performed a new haka, "Kapa o Pango", specially composed by Derek Lardelli and "...designed to reflect the multi-cultural make-up of contemporary New Zealandin particular the influence of Polynesian cultures". This new haka was to be reserved for special occasions and was not intended to replace "Ka Mate".

John Smit, the Springbok captain who faced the debut performance of "Kapa o Pango", said after the match: "To stand there and watch it for the first time was a privilege." The Daily Telegraph columnist Mick Cleary criticised the new haka as "unmistakably provocative", adding: "There is a fine line and the All Blacks crossed it. Carisbrook is a rugby field not a back-street alley." France's head coach Bernard Laporte requested New Zealand not to perform "Kapa o Pango" during their November 2006 tour of France, claiming "It's no good for the promotion of our sport."

On 24 September 2011, the All Blacks performed "Kapa o Pango" before their Pool A match against France at Eden Park, which included the act of drawing the thumb across the throat at the end. The French had eliminated New Zealand at the quarter-finals stage of the 2007 World Cup. The All Blacks' new haka then became a fixture during the 2011 knockout stages against Argentina and Australia, before the team met France again (and defeated them) in the final.

The All Blacks performed "Kapa o Pango" eight times during 2014, the highest number of performances in any one year since its inception. Also in 2014, there occurred the longest streak of four consecutive "Kapa o Pango" performances.

Controversy
"Kapa o Pango" concludes with a gesture which, according to Lardelli, represents "drawing vital energy into the heart and lungs". The gesture has been interpreted as a "throat slitting" gesture that led to accusations that "Kapa o Pango" encourages violence, and sends the wrong message to All Blacks fans.

The All Blacks opted not to perform "Kapa o Pango" in their opening test of 2006 against . It was requested that they perform their usual "Ka Mate" haka while a review was conducted into "Kapa o Pango". The action at the end of "Kapa o Pango" had drawn many complaints in the lead-up to the Irish test, with members of the public complaining about it to the NZRU. The NZRU said that it was not because of public pressure that it was not performed against Ireland.

In the run-up to the first All Blacks Test of the 2006 Tri Nations at Jade Stadium in Christchurch against , the NZRU completed their review, and concluded that the gesture had a radically different meaning within Māori culture and haka traditions, indicating the drawing of "hauora", the breath of life into the heart and lungs. As a result, "Kapa o Pango" was performed, complete with the final gesture, before the Australia test.

The controversial gesture was withdrawn in 2007, with a modified action (raking the right arm from the left hip to over the right shoulder) when "Kapa o Pango" was performed in test matches against France and South Africa.

During the 2008 Tri Nations series, the All Blacks appear to have reverted to the original action of drawing the hand across the throat.

The motion was again withdrawn when it was performed in 2019 Rugby World Cup against South Africa and Ireland in Japan.

Players who have led performances
For each New Zealand test match, one All Blacks player is assigned to lead the haka. Although the leader is often of Maori descent, this is not compulsory as several players have Polynesian heritage.

Since the introduction of "Kapa o Pango" in 2005, the following players have led the performance:

 Piri Weepu (25)
 TJ Perenara (13)
 Liam Messam (12)
 Keven Mealamu (7)
 Rico Gear  (3)
 Aaron Smith (3)
 Carl Hayman (2)
 Kieran Read (2)
 Tana Umaga (2)
 Hosea Gear (1)

Numbers in brackets indicate how many times each player has led the "Kapa o Pango" haka.

Outside rugby 
Part of "Kapa o Pango" is performed by the character Maui (voiced by Dwayne Johnson) in Walt Disney Animation Studios' 2016 film Moana.

References

Ritual dances
Māori culture
Haka